This is a list of films where demons appear.

Demons

 976-EVIL
 A Christmas Horror Story
 Alias Nick Beal
 The Alchemist Cookbook
 Alucarda
 Amityville II: The Possession
 Angel on My Shoulder
 Annabelle
 Annabelle Comes Home
 Annabelle: Creation
 Army of Darkness
 Antrum
 Ava's Possessions
 The Babadook
 Bedazzled (1967)
 Bedazzled (2000)
 Bedeviled
 Bill & Ted's Bogus Journey
 The Blackcoat's Daughter
 The Blood on Satan's Claw
 Bloody Mallory
 Cameron's Closet
 Children of the Corn
 A Chinese Ghost Story
 The Chosen
 The Church
 The Conjuring Universe
 The Conjuring 
 The Conjuring 2
 Constantine
 Countdown
 Credo
 The Crucifixion
 Cry of the Banshee
 The Curse of Sleeping Beauty
 Dead Before Dawn
 The Demon's Rook
 Damn Yankees
 Dark Angel: The Ascent
 Dark Waters
 The Day of the Beast
 Deathgasm
 Demon Hunter
 Demon Knight
 Demons
 Demons 2
 The Demons of Ludlow
 Demon House
 Drag Me to Hell
 Devil in My Ride
 The Devil Inside
 The Devil's Advocate
 The Devil's Carnival
 The Devil's Carnival: Alleluia!
 The Devil's Nightmare
 The Devil's Rock
 Dante's Inferno (1924)
 Dante's Inferno: An Animated Epic
 Demon Slayer: Kimetsu no Yaiba the Movie: Mugen Train
 The Devil and Daniel Webster
 The Devil and Max Devlin
 Devil's Den
 Doctor Strange
 Dogma
 Dominion: Prequel to the Exorcist
 Don't Kill It
 Doom
 Doom: Annihilation
 Drive Angry
 End of Days
 End of the Line
 Equinox
 The Evil
 The Evil Dead
Evil Dead
Evil Dead 2
Evilspeak
 The Evil Within
 The Exorcist
 The Exorcist: Italian Style
 Exorcist II: The Heretic
 The Exorcist III
 Exorcist: The Beginning
 Fallen
 Fantasia
 Farm House
 Faust 
 Faust: Love of the Damned
 Flesh for the Beast
 Forever Evil
 Frailty
 The Frighteners
 Funny Man
 The Gate
 Geometria
 Ghost Rider
 Ghost Rider: Spirit of Vengeance
 Gods of Egypt
 The Golden Child
 Hell and Back
 Hell Baby
 Hell's Highway
 Hellbenders
 Hellbound
 Hellboy (2004)
 Hellboy (2019)
 Hellboy II: The Golden Army
 Hellboy: Blood and Iron
 Hellboy: Sword of Storms
 Hellraiser
 Hellbound: Hellraiser II
 Hellraiser III: Hell on Earth
 Hellraiser: Bloodline
 Hellraiser: Inferno
 Hellraiser: Hellseeker
 Hellraiser: Deader
 Hellraiser: Hellworld
 Hellraiser: Revelations
 Hellraiser: Judgment
 Hereditary
 The Heretics
 Highway to Hell
 Horns
 Host
 House on Willow Street
 The House with a Clock in Its Walls
 Hulk: Where Monsters Dwell
 I, Frankenstein
 Idle Hands
 Inner Demons
 Incarnate
 Insidious
 It (2017)
 It Chapter Two (2019)
 Jack-O
 Jack O'Lantern
 Jeepers Creepers
 Jeepers Creepers 2
 Jeepers Creepers 3
 Jennifer's Body
 JeruZalem
 Joey
 Justice League Dark
 Justice League Dark: Apokolips War
 Justice League: The Flashpoint Paradox
 The Keep
 King Arthur: Legend of the Sword
 Knights of Badassdom
 Krampus
 Krampus: The Devil Returns
 Krampus: The Reckoning
 Krampus Unleashed
 Kuwaresma
 The Last Exorcism
 Legend
 Lights Out
 Little Evil
 Little Nicky
 Lo
 Manborg
 Mara
Mausoleum
 Mercy
 The Minion
 Mirrors
 Mortal Kombat Legends: Scorpion's Revenge
 My Demon Lover
 Ne Zha
 Needful Things
 Nekrotronic
 Nightbreed
 Night of the Demon (1957)
 Night of the Demons (1988)
 Night of the Demons (2009)
 Night of the Demons 2
 Night of the Demons 3
 The New Mutants
 The Nun
 The Omen (1976)
 The Omen (2006)
 Damien: Omen II
 Omen III: The Final Conflict
 Omen IV: The Awakening
 Paranormal Activity
 Paranormal Activity 2
 Paranormal Activity 3
 Paranormal Activity 4
 Paranormal Activity: The Marked Ones
 Paranormal Activity 2: Tokyo Night
 Pari
 The Possessed
 The Possession
 The Possession of Hannah Grace
 The Possession of Michael King
 The Princess and the Frog
 The Prophecy
 Princess Mononoke
 Pumpkinhead
 Pumpkinhead II: Blood Wings
 Pumpkinhead: Ashes to Ashes
 Pumpkinhead: Blood Feud
 Pyewacket
 The Queen of Spades (1916) 
 The Queen of Spades (1949)
 Rec
 Rec 2
 Rec 3: Genesis
 REC 4: Apocalypse
 Rosemary's Baby
 Satan's Slave
 Satanic Panic
 Season of the Witch
 Seklusyon
 The Seventh Curse
 Seventh Moon
 Shazam!
 Shortcut to Happiness
 Sinister
 Sinister 2
 Siren
 Slayers - The Motion Picture
 Someone Behind You
 Sometimes They Come Back Again
 The Soul of a Monster (1944)
 South Park: Bigger, Longer & Uncut (1999)
 Space Jam: A New Legacy
 Spawn
 Stephen King's The Stand
 The Student of Prague (1913)
 The Student of Prague (1926)
 The Student of Prague (1935)
 Tales of Halloween
 Teen Titans Go! vs. Teen Titans
 Teenage Exorcist
 Terror Toons
 This Is the End
 Thor: Ragnarok
 TMNT
 Ultramarines: A Warhammer 40,000 Movie
 The Unholy
 V/H/S
 Violent Shit
 The Wailing
 What Dreams May Come
 Where the Dead Go to Die
 Wicked City
 The Wind
 The Witch

See also
 List of films about angels
 List of films about witchcraft

References

External links
 IMDB – Keyword Demon

Demon
Demons in film